Angus Blair (born 1965) is a former Scottish international lawn and indoor bowler.

Bowls career
Blair made his international debut in 1984  and won a gold medal in the fours and a bronze medal in the singles at the 1992 World Outdoor Bowls Championship in Worthing.

He won the 1986 Scottish National Bowls Championships singles crown and subsequently won the singles at the British Isles Bowls Championships in 1987. He also won the national pairs in 1988 and the fours in 2001.

References

Living people
Scottish male bowls players
1965 births
Bowls World Champions